Tindall Wood, Ditchingham is a  biological Site of Special Scientific Interest north of Ditchingham in Norfolk.

This is one of the largest hornbeam woods in Norfolk. It is ancient coppice with standards, and the standards are oak, ash and hornbeam, and there are several uncommon species in the ground flora.

The wood is private with no public access.

References

Sites of Special Scientific Interest in Norfolk